Mangaweka is a township on the State Highway One (SH1), Manawatū-Whanganui region, in the North Island of New Zealand, with a population of just under 200. It is between Taihape to the north and Hunterville to the south. The Rangitikei River runs adjacent to the township, which is popular for rafting, kayaking, fishing and swimming.

The New Zealand Ministry for Culture and Heritage gives a translation of "weka stream" for Mangaweka.

The township is of interest not only for its historic main street, but also because of the growing artists' community. The main street is preserved in its original state due to SH1 being re-located in the early 1980s. This tore the heart out of the township as the main street became somewhat redundant. As a result, the settlement has become a tourist attraction.

A significant feature in Mangaweka is an elevated DC-3 aircraft. It was originally set above a service station, but this is currently closed and is awaiting redevelopment. In 2021 the plane was moved to Shannon for restoration. It is uncertain whether it will return. The Department of Conservation have several scenic reserve walks around Mangaweka including one on the former North Island Main Trunk railway line and tunnels, replaced by a deviation in 1981.

Notable people who have lived in Mangaweka include the New Zealand poet Sam Hunt, the artist Robin White (whose iconic "Mangaweka" painting hangs in Te Papa) and photographer/artist Richard Aslett. The town also hosts an annual "Fakes & Forgeries Art Exhibition and Festival" in October and November. Karl Sim, was a regular attendee until his death in 2013.

Other major features close to the town include some of the country's biggest railway viaducts on the Mangaweka deviation. Nearby, the Rangitikei River canyon provides the setting for the southern hemisphere's highest flying fox, an 80m bungy jump, as well as a The Lord of the Rings film location.

History 

Development at Mangaweka began with clearance of the forest for the North Island Main Trunk Railway. A shelter called Three Log Whare was built. From 1894 it had a mail link 3 times a week with Ohingaiti.

Demographics

The population of Mangaweka was 90 in the 2018 New Zealand census, a decrease of 15 (-14.3%) since the 2013 census, and a decrease of 21 (-18.9%) since the 2006 census. There were 45 males and 42 females, giving a sex ratio of 1.07 males per female. Ethnicities were 81 people  (90.0%) European/Pākehā, 12 (13.3%) Māori, and 3 (3.3%) Pacific peoples (totals add to more than 100% since people could identify with multiple ethnicities). Of the total population, 18 people  (20.0%) were under 15 years old, 6 (6.7%) were 15–29, 42 (46.7%) were 30–64, and 21 (23.3%) were over 65.

Makai Patea statistical area

The Mokai Patea statistical area surrounds but does not include Taihape, and also covers Pukeokahu, Moawhango, Mataroa, Papanui Junction, and Taoroa Junction. It had a population of 1,716 at the 2018 New Zealand census, a decrease of 45 people (-2.6%) since the 2013 census, and a decrease of 195 people (-10.2%) since the 2006 census. There were 657 households. There were 915 males and 801 females, giving a sex ratio of 1.14 males per female. The median age was 41 years (compared with 37.4 years nationally), with 342 people (19.9%) aged under 15 years, 291 (17.0%) aged 15 to 29, 822 (47.9%) aged 30 to 64, and 258 (15.0%) aged 65 or older.

Ethnicities were 87.1% European/Pākehā, 21.5% Māori, 1.4% Pacific peoples, 0.5% Asian, and 1.7% other ethnicities (totals add to more than 100% since people could identify with multiple ethnicities).

The proportion of people born overseas was 7.3%, compared with 27.1% nationally.

Although some people objected to giving their religion, 47.9% had no religion, 40.7% were Christian, 0.2% were Buddhist and 3.5% had other religions.

Of those at least 15 years old, 189 (13.8%) people had a bachelor or higher degree, and 285 (20.7%) people had no formal qualifications. The median income was $34,000, compared with $31,800 nationally. The employment status of those at least 15 was that 813 (59.2%) people were employed full-time, 282 (20.5%) were part-time, and 27 (2.0%) were unemployed.

Education

See also
Mangaweka deviation 
Mangaweka railway station

References 

Populated places in Manawatū-Whanganui
Rangitikei District
Populated places on the Rangitīkei River